The Infantry Training Centre (ITC) is a unit of the British Army, administered by HQ School of Infantry and responsible for the basic training and advanced training of soldiers and officers joining the infantry. The unit's headquarters are at Catterick, North Yorkshire.

History 
ITC Catterick assumed overall responsibility for all infantry phase 2 training from the three Infantry Training Battalion sites at Catterick, Strensall and Ouston on 1 May 1995. As of May 2002, the ITC assumed full control of all infantry phase 1 and 2 training for the Regular Army in a single Combat Infantryman's Course (CIC). The course was subsequently renamed the Combat Infantry Course (CIC) to reflect the inclusion of female recruits.

Training regime 
Whereas initial training for other army roles is delivered in two stages - Phase 1 (basic training) and Phase 2 (trade-specific training) - the Combat Infantry Course combines both into a single course for Standard Entrants aged 17.5 years and above. (Junior Entrants enlisted from age 16 and destined for the infantry receive their Phase 1 basic training separately at the Army Foundation College in Harrogate before joining ITC for their Phase 2 training.)

The basic CIC lasts 26 weeks, in which the basics of infantry soldiering are taught:
 Personal administration
 Weapons training
 Drill
 Fieldcraft
 Fitness
 Teamwork
Both the Foot Guards and Parachute Regiment have extended versions of the CIC that last an additional two weeks. New recruits to the Foot Guards undertake an extended drill programme for regular public duties. The Parachute Regiment course incorporates additional fitness work with Pegasus Company, including eight demanding assessments such as a 20-mile endurance march and milling, a gruelling test derived from boxing.

The course for new Gurkha recruits lasts for 37 weeks, incorporating the CIC course with English language training and cultural orientation for the United Kingdom.

Structure
ITC Catterick is divided into three Battalions, of which two are Infantry Training Battalions (ITB) and one is a support Battalion (ITC).
1st Infantry Training Battalion is responsible for training soldiers destined to join the regiments of the Queen's Division, The Rifles, the King's Division and the Scottish, Welsh and Irish Division. The 1st Battalion has five training companies:
Queen's Division Company
Peninsula Training Company
Rifles Training Company
King's Division Company
Scots, Welsh and Irish Division Company
2nd Infantry Training Battalion has responsibility for training recruits who will join one of the regiments of the Guards Division, the Parachute Regiment and the Brigade of Gurkhas. 2 ITB is also responsible for the Phase 2 training for junior entry recruits from the Army Foundation College, as well as training for the infantry elements of the Army Reserve.
Guards Training Company
Parachute Regiment Training Company
Gurkha Training Company
Anzio Company
The ITC Support Battalion is the ITC's primary support unit, dealing with logistic and medical support. The battalion has the following departments:
Headquarter (HQ) Company
Hook VC Company (discharged soldiers)
Gym
Army School of Ceremonial
Army School of Bagpipe Music and Highland Drumming
Quartermaster's (QMs) Department
G7 Training
400 Troop, Royal Logistic Corps

See also 
 Recruit training
 Infantry of the British army
 P Company

References

External links 
 

Installations of the British Army
Education in North Yorkshire
Organisations based in North Yorkshire
Richmondshire
Training establishments of the British Army
UK